Ishimsky (masculine), Ishimskaya (feminine), or Ishimskoye (neuter) may refer to:
 Ishimsky District, a district of Tyumen Oblast, Russia
 Ishim, Tyumen Oblast, a town in Russia

See also
 Ishim (disambiguation)
 Ust-Ishimsky District, Omsk Oblast, Russia
 Ishimsky Uyezd, Tobolsk Governorate, Russian Empire